Thomas Henry Williams (2 May 1862 – 6 June 1953) was an English-born Australian politician.

The son of Thomas and Mary Williams, he arrived in Victoria in 1870. He worked as a drover from Queensland through New South Wales south to Victoria, before engaging in a speculation in Western Australia that saw him lose severely. He worked his transport back to Melbourne by shearing, fencing and tank sinking. On 9 February 1889 he married Rosina Victoria Beaudoin, with whom he had eight children. He was involved in the founding of the Shearers' Union, serving as secretary of the Scone branch in 1891. In 1891 he was elected to the New South Wales Legislative Assembly for Upper Hunter, representing the new Labor Party. He refused the pledge and did not contest the 1894 election. Williams died in 1953.

References

1862 births
1953 deaths
Members of the New South Wales Legislative Assembly
Australian Labor Party members of the Parliament of New South Wales
English emigrants to Australia